The big-eared opossum (Didelphis aurita) also known as a saruê   is an opossum species from South America. It is found in Argentina, Brazil and Paraguay.

This species, which was considered a population of the common opossum (D. marsupialis) for some time, was originally described as D. azarae by Coenraad Jacob Temminck in 1824, but this name was incorrectly given to the white-eared opossum (D. albiventris) for over 160 years. As such, the name azarae has been abandoned.

Due to carrying an off-spring, female Big-eared opossums tend to stay in smaller areas and reduce their movements.

References

External links

facts and pictures at Animal Diversity Web
Diogo Loretto, & Marcus Vinícius Vieira. (2005). The Effects of Reproductive and Climatic Seasons on Movements in the Black-Eared Opossum (Didelphis aurita Wied-Neuwied, 1826). Journal of Mammalogy, 86(2), 287–293. http://www.jstor.org/stable/4094347

Opossums
Marsupials of South America
Mammals of Brazil
Mammals of Argentina
Mammals of Paraguay
Mammals described in 1826